Michael J. Brady (born March 21, 1987) is an American former professional baseball pitcher. He previously played in Major League Baseball (MLB) for the  Oakland Athletics.

Career

Florida Marlins
Brady attended Santa Margarita Catholic High School and after graduating, attended the University of California, Berkeley, and played for the California Golden Bears baseball team. He was drafted as a shortstop by the Florida Marlins in the 24th round of the 2009 Major League Baseball draft.

Brady made his professional debut with the Class A-Short Season Jamestown Jammers and, later, the Rookie league Gulf Coast Marlins in 2009. Between the two teams, he played 8 games at third base and 3 games at second base.

He returned to the Jammers in 2010, but this time as a pitcher. In 49 games out of the bullpen, Brady accrued a 1–1 win–loss record with 3 saves and a 1.59 earned run average (ERA). He advanced to the Class A Greensboro Grasshoppers and Double-A Jacksonville Suns in 2011. In 2012, he pitched for the Class A Jupiter Hammerheads and also participated in the Arizona Fall League. His 2013 season was entirely spent at Double-A Jacksonville, where he went 2–2 with 23 saves and a 1.53 ERA.

Brady was added to the Marlins' 40-man roster after the 2013 season, but designated for assignment before the start of the 2014 season.

Los Angeles Angels
He was claimed off waivers by the Los Angeles Angels who assigned him to the Double-A Arkansas Travelers. He went back and forth between Double-A and the Triple-A Salt Lake Bees in 2014.

Washington Nationals
On December 10, 2015, the Angels traded Brady and fellow pitcher Trevor Gott to the Washington Nationals for Yunel Escobar and cash considerations. The Nationals invited Brady to Spring Training as a non-roster invitee. He started 2016 with the Triple-A Syracuse Chiefs, going back and forth between there and the Double-A Harrisburg Senators. He elected free agency after the season.

Oakland Athletics
Brady signed a minor league contract with the Oakland Athletics for 2017 that included an invitation to Spring Training. He was assigned to the Triple-A Nashville Sounds where he had a 3–1 record with 42 strikeouts and a 3.67 ERA through June 11.

He was called up by the Oakland Athletics on June 17 to work as a long-reliever out of the bullpen. He made his major league debut on June 20 pitching one inning of relief against the Houston Astros. He was outrighted to Triple-A on November 5, 2017, and then elected to become a free agent.

Milwaukee Brewers
On November 27, 2017, Brady signed a minor league contract with the Milwaukee Brewers. He elected free agency on November 2, 2018.

References

External links

1987 births
Living people
Baseball players from California
Major League Baseball pitchers
Oakland Athletics players
California Golden Bears baseball players
Jamestown Jammers players
Gulf Coast Marlins players
Greensboro Grasshoppers players
Jacksonville Suns players
Jupiter Hammerheads players
Phoenix Desert Dogs players
Arkansas Travelers players
Salt Lake Bees players
Harrisburg Senators players
Syracuse Chiefs players
Nashville Sounds players
Colorado Springs Sky Sox players